Bärenburger Schnurre is an East German family film directed by Ralf Kirsten. It was released in 1957.

Cast
 Paul Heidemann as Bürgermeister
 Axel Dietrich as Hansel
 Erika Dunkelmann as Hansels Mutter
 Harry Hindemith as  Hansels Vater
 Doris Abeßer as  Hansels Schwester
 Kurt Ulrich as  Lehrer Möbius
 Christoph Picha as  Peter
 Gerry Wolff as  Stadtrat Müller
 Helga Göring as  Karins Mutter
 Eberhard Kratz as  Pförtner Bräsicke
 Herbert Lange as  1. Volkspolizist
 Fritz Stoewer as  2. Volkspolizist
 Ellen Plessow as  Pförtnerin
 Walter E. Fuß as  Fahrer des Bürgermeisters
 Carl Hamann as  Nachtpförtner

External links
 

1957 films
East German films
1950s German-language films
German black-and-white films
1950s German films